Szabadszállás is a small town in Bács-Kiskun county, Hungary, 80 kilometres south of Budapest by rail.
The town is surrounded by several areas of the Kiskunság National Park.

Twin cities 
 Schönenberg-Kübelberg

Gallery

References

External links 

  in Hungarian
 Szabadszállás on Google Maps
 Szabadszállás a Vendégvárón
 Szabadszállás a Gyaloglón
 Légifotók Szabadszállásról

Populated places in Bács-Kiskun County
Towns in Hungary